Theodore Bruce (5 April 1847 – 2 July 1911) was an auctioneer, politician and Mayor of Adelaide 1904–1907.

History

Theodore Bruce was born in Leeds, Yorkshire, a son of William Bruce, a large woollens manufacturer. A grandfather, Edward Baines, was the proprietor of the Leeds Mercury and member of the House of Commons for Leeds.

He came to Australia with his parents in 1852, and shortly after his arrival commenced his elementary education at J. L. Young's Adelaide Educational Institution, followed by St. Peter's College. His first employment was at a station in the far north of the South Australia, then in 1862 joined Randolph Isham Stow in the law firm of Stow & Bruce, followed around 1872 by the National Bank of Adelaide, which required him to travel around the north of the State, during which time he became an expert horseman.

His father, son of a Congregationalist minister in Wakefield, Yorkshire set up as a merchant in Adelaide in 1852 and retired in 1863, returned to England in 1876, and died at Ilkley in 1893, aged of 96 years. His mother died in 1890.

In 1878 or 1880 he started an auctioneering business with old school-friend George S. Aldridge (1847–1911), later chairman of the Stock Exchange. They founded a brewery in Broken Hill, which Bruce managed, then in 1888 sold to the South Australian Brewing and Wine and Spirit Company. The partnership was dissolved in 1889, and Bruce continued as auctioneer on his own, with offices in the Old Exchange, Pirie street. He became a member of the Adelaide Stock Exchange. The business continues under his name to this day.

Politics
Around 1895 he was elected councillor by the Goodwood Ward for the Unley Council, and served for two years, then was elected mayor in 1898 and 1899. He also served from 1894 as councillor in the Adelaide Corporation for the Hindmarsh Ward, and on the death of the Hon. Samuel Tomkinson was elected alderman, and held the office of mayor of Adelaide in 1904–1906. His proudest achievement was the agreement thrashed out with Premier Thomas Price for establishment of Adelaide's tramways network. Bruce was accorded the honour of turning the first sod, and was the City Council's first representative on the Municipal Tramways Trust.

He stood twice for seats in the House of Assembly: for East Adelaide and for Torrens, both times beaten by the Labor candidate. He was elected to the Legislative Council in May 1909, filling the Central District seat vacated by A. A. Kirkpatrick. Bruce died two years later; he was succeeded by Charles Richard Morris.

Other interests
He was a member of the Yorkshire Society, and elected its first president just a few days before his death.

He was founder of Goodwood Institute.

He was a member of the Southern Suburban Volunteer Company, which was formed during a Russian war scare in the 1880s. He served as senior lieutenant and qualified for promotion to captain, but the force was merged into the militia and he retired.

Bruce was a noted patron of the arts, and had in his Hyde Park home a fine collection of paintings.

In his youth he was a keen athlete; excelling at the high jump and sprint races. He purchased a two-year-old horse "Lord Wilton", which won several races for him. Later on Fred Bruce and George S. Aldridge took shares on the horse, but had no success, so they sold her to E. W. Ellis, and within a few months she won the 1885 Adelaide Cup (held that year in Melbourne).

Mr. Bruce had many personal friends, but two stand out: Jim Dick and George S. Aldridge, the latter being his business partner, brother-in-law and lifelong friend.

Family
Theodore Bruce (ca.1847 – 1 July 1911) married Mary Ellen McFie ( – 12 October 1946) on 21 August 1876, had home "Woodhurst", Jasper Street, Hyde Park, and "St. Ann's" at Mt. Lofty.
eldest son Frederic Theodore "Fred" Bruce married Kathleen L. Park Macindoe on 4 October 1911, lived Balaklava
elder daughter (Nellie) Gertrude Bruce ( – 13 January 1938) lived at Ramornie, Hawkers road, Medindie.
Talbot Haines Bruce, MC, married Betty Martin-Row on 8 October 1930. Talbot was with RAF during World War I
son Harold Bruce at Balaklava
Muriel Bruce emigrated to England

Theodore Bruce suffered from chronic rheumatism, which was causing him considerable distress when he died. His remains were cremated at the West Terrace Cemetery.

References

Australian auctioneers
People educated at Adelaide Educational Institution
People educated at St Peter's College, Adelaide
Mayors and Lord Mayors of Adelaide
Members of the South Australian Legislative Council
19th-century Australian businesspeople
20th-century Australian businesspeople
1847 births
1911 deaths
Burials at West Terrace Cemetery